Haywards Heath Town is an electoral division of West Sussex in the United Kingdom, and returns one member to sit on West Sussex County Council.

Extent
The division covers the central part of the town of Haywards Heath.

It comprises the following Mid Sussex District wards: Haywards Heath Ashenground Ward and Haywards Heath Heath Ward; and of the central part of the civil parish of Haywards Heath.

Election results

2013 Election
Results of the election held on 2 May 2013:

2009 Election
Results of the election held on 4 June 2009:

2005 Election
Results of the election held on 5 May 2005:

External links
 West Sussex County Council
 Election Maps

Electoral Divisions of West Sussex
Haywards Heath